The rufous-eyed brook frog or rufous-eyed stream frog (Duellmanohyla rufioculis), is a species of frog in the family Hylidae. It is endemic to the mountains of Costa Rica. Its natural habitats are premontane wet forests and rainforests. Tadpoles are found in pools with standing water. Habitat loss is posing some threat to the species, although the overall population is stable.

Description 
Color is extremely variable, ranging from brown to mottled mossy green. A distinct white stripe along the upper lip, flanks, and groin expands beneath the eyes to form a prominent white mark. All specimens have a distinctive red iris with horizontal pupils.

Habitat 
The rufous-eyed brook frog is endemic to the mountainous regions of Costa Rica, and can be found on the Caribbean and Pacific slopes from  asl. This species favors humid forests, and lives in foliage alongside streams. Though threatened by habitat destruction and uncommon within its range, the overall population is believed to be stable.

References 

rufioculis
Amphibians of Costa Rica
Endemic fauna of Costa Rica
Amphibians described in 1952
Taxa named by Edward Harrison Taylor
Taxonomy articles created by Polbot